Shijiazhuang, formerly known as Shimen and romanized as Shihkiachwang, is the capital and most populous city of China’s Hebei Province.

As of the 2020 census, the city had a total population of 11,235,086, with 6,230,709 in the built-up (or metro) area comprising all urban districts but Jingxing District not agglomerated and Zhengding County largely conurbated with the Shijiazhuang metropolitan area as urbanization continues to proliferate. Shijiazhuang's total population ranked twelfth in mainland China.

Shijiazhuang experienced dramatic growth after the founding of the People's Republic of China in 1949. The population of the metropolitan area has more than quadrupled in 30 years as a result of industrialization and infrastructural developments. From 2008 to 2011, Shijiazhuang implemented a three-year plan which concluded with the reorganization of the city, resulting in an increase of green areas and new buildings and roads. A train station, airport and a subway system have been opened.

Name
The city's present name, Shijiazhuang, first appeared during the Ming dynasty. Its literal meaning is "Shi family's village". The word Shijiazhuang was generally used after construction of the Shijiazhuang station of the Zhengtai Railway in 1907.

The origin of the name is heavily disputed. One story claimed that the Wanli Emperor sent 24 officers and their families to the area, after which the group splits into two settlements consisting of 10 and 14 families. The imperial court then named the settlements "village of 10 families" and "village of 14 families", respectively. Since the Chinese characters for ten and stone are homophones, it is speculated that the city name gradually evolved into its current spelling. Another explanation is that the settlement was named after the highest-ranking official amongst the groups, who was surnamed Shi. However, a county named Shiyi, in present-day Luquan District, was already present during the Warring States period, suggesting that the name, or its elements, have even older origins.

At first, the settlement was officially known only as "Shijia", as the "zhuang" was solely used to denote the nature of the settlement being a village, instead of being part of its name. This was further evidenced on June 24, 1925, when the Republican government ordered the village to be established as an autonomous city under the name Shijia. The city ended up being renamed as Shimen when it was officially incorporated on August 29, 1925, after the merger with another village, Xiumen. Despite being renamed, however, many documents and war plans from the Second Sino-Japanese War and the Chinese Civil War still referred to the city as "Shijiazhuang" or "Shizhuang". To avoid confusion and association with the Japanese Army, the Chinese Communist Party ultimately reverted the city's name back to Shijiazhuang on December 26, 1947. Since then, many terms regarding the city have been stemmed from the "zhuang" suffix, including its nickname "international village", and the colloquial demonym, "villagers".

History

Pre-Qin period

This area was occupied by Xianyu people at beginning of Zhou dynasty, and later belonged to the Zhongshan (中山國) and Zhao states at pre-Qin period.

Qin and Han dynasties
In pre-Han times (i.e., before 206 BC), the site of the city of Shiyi in the state of Zhao was located in this area. After taking over Zhao, Qin Shi Huang established the Hengshan Commandery in the region. It became part of the Zhao Principality under Western Han. The land was briefly granted to Liu Buyi, son of the Emperor Hui, during Empress Dowager Lü's reign. The territory was then passed to Liu Hong, Emperor Houshao of Han, after Buyi's death. It was then granted to Liu Chao, another son of Emperor Hui. During the defeat of the Lü clan, Liu Chao was killed and the territory became a commandery of Zhao once again. Later, due to a naming taboo of Emperor Wen of Han, whose personal name is Liu Heng, its name was changed to Changshan (常山). From Han (206 BC–AD 220) to Sui (581–618) times it was the site of a county seat named Shiyi.

Tang dynasty
With the reorganization of local government in the early period of the Tang dynasty (618–907), Hengshan county was abolished, and it was reestablished as a prefecture. It was renamed as Zhen Prefecture due to a naming taboo with Emperor Muzong of Tang, whose personal name was Li Heng.

Yuan and Song dynasties
Zhending was a giant city in the area, now Zhengding county, where was destination of migration from Yuan dynasty people and central area of preceding Northern Song dynasty people, particularly in Kaifeng and Zhengzhou etc.

Ming and Qing dynasties
The name "Shijiazhuang" was first mentioned in 1535 on a stele of a local temple. Shijiazhuang was then little more than a local market town, subordinated to the flourishing city of Zhengding a few miles to the north.

Republican era

The growth of Shijiazhuang into one of China's major cities began in 1905, when the Beijing–Wuhan (Hankou) railway reached the area, stimulating trade and encouraging local farmers to grow cash crops. Two years later the town became the junction for the new Shitai line, running from Shijiazhuang to Taiyuan, Shanxi. The connection transformed the town from a local collecting center and market into a communications center of national importance on the main route from Beijing and Tianjin to Shanxi, and later, when the railway from Taiyuan was extended to the southwest, to Shaanxi as well. The city also became the center of an extensive road network.

Pre-World War II Shijiazhuang was a large railway town as well as a commercial and collecting center for Shanxi and regions farther west and for agricultural produce of the North China Plain, particularly grain, tobacco, and cotton. By 1935 it had far outstripped Zhengding as an economic center. At the end of World War II the character of the city changed when it took on an administrative role as the preeminent city in western Hebei, and developed into an industrial city. Some industries, such as match manufacturing, tobacco processing, and glassmaking, had already been established before the war. By 1941, Shide railway line was constructed between Shijiazhuang and Dezhou, Shandong in the war occupied period, operated by North China Transportation Company.

On November 12, 1947, the city was captured by Communist forces. Today, the area is a memorial site.

People's Republic
Since the city was pivotal to the People's Liberation Army's victory of the Chinese Civil War, many governmental agencies have roots in Shijiazhuang. The creation of the North China People's Government in 1947 affirmed the city's position as a key political center. A year later, as the result of the merger between the Bank of North China, the Bank of Beihai, and the Northwest Agricultural Bank, the People's Bank of China was established here, where it produced and released the first series of the renminbi.

Meanwhile, the industrialization of the city also gathered momentum thanks to government initiatives including the First Five-Year Plan. Shijiazhuang was one of the fourteen cities selected as focus cities for development. The population more than tripled in the decade 1948–58 after Communist won the civil war. In the 1950s, the city experienced a major expansion in the textile industry, with large-scale cotton spinning, weaving, printing, and dyeing works. In addition, there are plants processing local farm produce. In the 1960s it was the site of a new chemical industry, with plants producing fertilizer and caustic soda. Shijiazhuang also became an engineering base, with a tractor-accessory plant. There are important coal deposits at Jingxing and Huailu, now named Luquan, a few miles to the west in the foothills of the Taihang Mountains, which provide fuel for a thermal-generating plant supplying power to local industries.

Tianjin was again carved out of Hebei in 1967, remaining a separate entity today. The provincial capital was then moved to Baoding, however, the city was plunged into chaos due to the Cultural Revolution just a year later. Thus, under the direction of Mao Zedong to "prepare for war and natural disasters", Shijiazhuang became the provincial capital in 1968.

Beginning in the 1990s, Shijiazhuang saw another episode of rapid growth and development. Starting from the plains area in the east and south of the city, the focus of the developments later shifted towards the mountainous districts and counties in the west, as well as along the Hutuo River in the north.

In the early hours of March 16, 2001, four apartment buildings were leveled after a series of explosions rocked the city, killing 108 while injuring 38. The perpetrator was a deaf, unemployed man named Jin Ruchao who police arrested weeks later. Jin confessed that he had delivered the bombs via taxi and stated that the bombings were an act of revenge on his relatives, who were among the tenants of the apartments. Jin and his accomplices were later executed.

In December 2020, its mayor, Deng Peiran, was charged with corruption, with Ma Yujun currently serving as the acting mayor. A few weeks later, the city became a new COVID-19 hotspot: starting from the village of Xiaoguozhuang in Gaocheng District in the northern portion of the city, cases has been increasing rapidly since January 2, 2021. Due to its proximity with Beijing and the severity of the outbreak, harsh measures were put into place, with all 11 million residences undergoing mandatory testing, as well as school closures, banning of gatherings, and residential districts being sealed. All highways were blocked off, with rail and air links also suspended.

Throughout the years, the city's administrative units have been shifted and adjusted multiple times. Initially, Shijiazhuang was administered under the prefecture of the same name, along with the counties of Zhengding, Pingshan, Lingshou, Jingxing, Jianping, Huailu, Jinxian, Gaocheng, Luancheng, Zhaoxian, Shulu, Yuanshi, Zanhuang, Gaoyi, and one town, Xinji. The first new district of the city, Jingxing Mining District, was created on June 27, 1950. On November 7, 1952, Hengshui Prefecture, to the east, was merged into Shijiazhuang, adding six more counties. The prefecture continued to expand after Dingxian Prefecture was split and merged into Baoding and Shijiazhuang on June 18, 1954. Between March 1960 and May 1961, the prefecture and the city merged. Thereafter, however, the prefecture was re-established, with Hengshui Prefecture splitting away the next year. The city and its prefecture merged for good in June 1993. In the 2010s, Shijiazhuang's administrative divisions saw further changes. In 2013, the county-level city of Xinji, although still part of Shijiazhuang prefecture, is now directly administered by Hebei province. Later, the State Council of the People's Republic of China approved more adjustments to the city's divisions. Qiaodong District was dissolved and merged into Chang'an and Qiaoxi districts. Three county-level cities, Gaocheng, Luquan, and Luancheng, became urban districts.

Geography

Shijiazhuang is located in south-central Hebei, and is part of the Bohai Economic Rim. Bordering prefecture-level cities in Hebei are Hengshui (E), Xingtai (S), and Baoding (N/NE). To the west lies the province of Shanxi.

The city stands at the edge of the North China Plain, which rises to the Taihang Mountains to the west of the city, and lies south of the Hutuo River. From west to east, the topography can be summarised as moderately high mountains, then low-lying mountains, hills, basin, and finally plains. Out of the eight east–west routes across the Taihang Mountains, the fifth, the Niangzi Pass, connects the city directly with Taiyuan, Shanxi.

The mountainous part of the prefecture consists of parts of:
Jingxing Mining District
Jingxing County
Zanhuang County
Xingtang County
Lingshou County
Yuanshi County
Luquan District

The Hutuo River Basin in the east juts into: 
Xinle City
Wuji County
Shenze County
Jinzhou City
Gaocheng District
Gaoyi County
Zhao County
Luancheng District
Zhengding County
The metropolitan area and its suburbs, in their entirety
All of the divisions mentioned in the above list, except for Jingxing Mining District

Climate
The city has a continental, monsoon-influenced semi-arid climate (Köppen BSk), characterised by hot, humid summers due to the East Asian monsoon, and generally cold, windy, very dry winters that reflect the influence of the Siberian anticyclone. Spring can see sandstorms blowing in from the Mongolian steppe, accompanied by rapidly warming, but generally dry, conditions. Autumn is similar to spring in temperature and lack of rainfall. With the monthly percent possible sunshine ranging from 45 percent in July to 61 percent in May, the city receives 2,427 hours of sunshine annually. More than half of the annual rainfall occurs in July and August alone.

Air quality

According to the National Environmental Analysis released by Tsinghua University and The Asian Development Bank in January 2013, Shijiazhuang was one of ten most air-polluted cities in the world. Also according to this report, 7 of 10 most air-polluted cities are in China, including Taiyuan, Beijing, Urumqi, Lanzhou, Chongqing, Jinan and Shijiazhuang. As air pollution in China is at an all-time high, several northern cities are among the most polluted cities and have some of the worst air quality in China. Reporting on China's air quality has been accompanied by what seems like a monochromatic slideshow of the country's several cities smothered in thick smog. According to a survey made by "Global voices China" in February 2013, Shijiazhuang is among China's 10 most polluted cities along with other cities including major Chinese cities like Beijing and Zhengzhou, and 6 other prefectural cities all in Hebei. These cities are all situated in traditional geographic subdivision of "Huabei (North China) Region".

In 2020, annual average PM2.5 Air Pollution in Shijiazhuang stood at 56 µg/m³, which is 11.2 times the World Health Organization PM2.5 Guideline (5 µg/m³: set in September, 2021). These pollution levels are estimated to reduce the Life Expectancy of an average person living in Shijiazhuang by almost 5 years.

A lack of cold air flow, combined with slow-moving air masses carrying industrial emissions, collected airborne pollutants to form a thick layer of smog over the region. Officials blamed the dense pollution on lack of wind, automobile exhaust emissions under low air pressure, and coal-powered district heating system in North China region. Prevailing winds blew low-hanging air masses of factory emissions (mostly SO2) towards China's east coast.

Current leaders

Administrative divisions 
Shijiazhuang has direct administrative jurisdiction over:

Demographics 
Migrants flowing in from all across China largely contributed to the population growth of Shijiazhuang in recent times. With a population of 120,000 in 1947, Shijiazhuang became the first medium-large city captured by the Chinese Communist Party from the Kuomintang. By the time of the People's Republic of China's founding in 1949, the total urban population increased to more than 270,000 people, more than doubling in a span of two years. In 1953, when China rolled out its first five-year plan, the total population of Shijiazhuang's urban area increased to 320,000. In 1960, the total population of the Shijiazhuang urban area had reached 650,000. In 1968, the city experienced a substantial increase due to it being designated the capital of Hebei to avoid chaos in Baoding amidst the Cultural Revolution. By 1980, the urban population had surpassed the one million mark, joining the ranks of a large city. As of the end of 2017, the urban population of Shijiazhuang exceeded 4.5 million.

In just six decades, the city's population has increased by more than 20 fold. At the end of 2009, the city's total non-migrant population was 9,774,100, an increase of 109,300 over the previous year. The birth rate of the city's population is 14.65%, the death rate is 6.25%, and the natural growth rate is 8.4%.

According to the sixth national census in 2010, the city's total non-migrant population stands at 10,163,788. Compared with the fifth national census a decade prior, there was an increase of 818,365 people, or an increase of 8.76%, and an average annual growth rate of 0.84%. Among them, the male population stood at 5,087,913, accounting for 50.06% of the total population; the female population is 5,075,875, accounting for 49.94% of the total population. The gender ratio of the total population is 100 women per 100.24 men. The population aged between 0 and 14 is 1,548,125, accounting for 15.23% of the total population; the population aged between 15 and 64 is 7,789,753, accounting for 76.64% of the total population; the population aged 65 and over is 825,910, accounting for 8.13% of the total population.

The top 10 surnames of Shijiazhuang are: Zhang (10.27%), Wang (9.25%), Li (9.17%), Liu (6.73%), Zhao (4.28%), Yang (2.82%), Gao (2.08%), Chen (1.92%), Ma (1.77%), and Guo (1.55%).

On May 6, 2011, the Chinese Academy of Social Sciences published the "2011 China Urban Competitiveness Blue Book: China Urban Competitiveness Report". In it, the happiness survey sampled 294 cities across China, arriving at the conclusion that the residents of Shijiazhuang were the happiest. This result caused strong doubts from netizens.

Economy 

In 2014, the GDP of Shijiazhuang reached CNY(RMB)￥510.02 billion (about $80.45 billion in USD), an increase of 12 percent over the previous year, and placing the city 20th in provincial capitals by GDP.

Shijiazhuang has become a major industrial city in North China and is considered to be the economic center of Hebei province, along with Tangshan. The city also located in Beijing-Tianjin-Shijiazhuang Hi-Tech Industrial Belt, which is one of the main Hi-Tech Belts in China. Nicknamed the "medicine hub of China", it's home to major pharmaceutical companies and factories like the North China Pharmaceutical Group Corporation, Shijiazhuang Pharma Group, and Shineway Pharma. The textile industry is also one of the backbones of the city's commerce. Other sectors include machinery and chemicals, building materials, light industry, and electronics. With abundant agricultural resources, Shijiazhuang has 590,000 hectares  of cultivated land and is the main source of cotton, pears, dates and walnuts in Hebei province.

In 2008, total imports reached US$1.393 billion, an increase of 42.1 percent over the previous year. Exports increased by 34.9 percent to US$5.596 billion. 

2006 World Bank reported that Shijiazhuang was spending less than RMB400 per capita on education, as opposed to Beijing (RMB1,044) and Weihai (RMB1,631).

Development zones
Shijiazhuang High-Tech Industrial Development Zone
The zone was established in March 1991 as a state-level development zone and is divided into three districts. National highways 107, 207, 307, 308 pass through the zone. Industries include pharmaceuticals, electronic information, mechanical production, automobile manufacturing, chemicals production and logistics.

The district focuses on the establishment of new high-tech enterprises. A railway line operated by Shijiazhuang Oil Refinery runs through the zone from north to south, so enterprises in the zone can build lines of their own.

It focuses on small- and medium-sized technology enterprises and technology incubation.

By 2009, some 2,600 enterprises had settled in the zone, of which 185 were foreign-funded enterprises. Firms from Japan, the US, the Republic of Korea, Germany, Italy, Canada, Malaysia, Hong Kong, Macao and Taiwan had established themselves in the zone.

Dairy
The city is a center for the dairy trade, being the headquarters of the Sanlu Group. Sanlu became Shijiazhuang's largest taxpayer since it had become the largest formula seller in China for a continuous 15-year period. Richard McGregor, author of The Party: The Secret World of China's Communist Rulers, said that Sanlu became "an invaluable asset for a city otherwise struggling to attract industry and investment on a par with China's premier metropolises."

Both the dairy trade and Sanlu were affected by the 2008 Chinese milk scandal. The chairman and general manager of Sanlu, and several party officials, including the vice-mayor in charge of food and agriculture, Zhang Fawang, were reportedly removed from office. Mayor Ji Chuntang reportedly resigned on September 17, 2008.

Transportation

Expressways
The city is served by many expressways, including the Shitai, Beijing–Shenzhen and Taiyuan–Cangzhou Expressways.

Railway

Shijiazhuang is a transportation hub at the intersection point of the Beijing–Guangzhou, Taiyuan–Dezhou, and Shuozhou–Huanghua railways. The new Shijiazhuang railway station (opened December 2012) has a rare distinction of being served by both the "conventional" Beijing–Guangzhou Railway and the new Beijing–Guangzhou–Shenzhen–Hong Kong High-Speed Railway. Such an arrangement is fairly uncommon on China's high-speed rail network, as typically high-speed lines are constructed to bypass city cores, where the older "conventional" train stations are.

This is the first time a high-speed railway has been run under a Chinese city.

There is also the smaller Shijiazhuang North railway station, used by trains going west toward Taiyuan without the need for passing though downtown.

Metro

Line 1, Line 2 and Line 3 of the Shijiazhuang Metro are currently operational. The latest metro plan of Shijiazhuang includes 6 lines in total.

Airport
The Shijiazhuang Zhengding International Airport is the province's center of air transportation. It is about 30 kilometers northeast of the city. There are 32 domestic routes arriving at and departing from Shijiazhuang, including destinations such as Shanghai, Shenzhen and Dalian. The airport serves 12 international destinations including four routes to Russia. The airport is being expanded and will be capable of being an alternate airport to Beijing Capital International Airport.

With the opening of the Beijing–Guangzhou High-Speed Railway at the end of 2012, the airport got its own train station, making available fast, although infrequent, train service between the airport and Shijiazhuang railway station, as well as other stations in the region.

Cycling
Most large roads in the city feature a separate cycle lane and, combined with the city being flat, make it ideal for cycling. Thousands of cyclists use the city each day and often there are more cyclists waiting at a crossroad than cars.

Military 
Shijiazhuang is headquarters of the 27th Group Army of the People's Liberation Army, one of the three group armies that comprise the Beijing Military Region responsible for defending China's capital.

Culture

City centre

The city of Shijiazhuang is similar to Beijing in that all roads run from north to south and east to west, making the city easy to navigate. Many roads have cycle paths making it cyclist friendly. In the heart of the city is the Hebei Museum which was refurbished in 2013 and 2014. It holds regular events, mostly showing traditional Chinese art and artifacts. The Yutong International Sports Centre hosts the Shijiazhuang Ever Bright football matches as well as holding pop concerts.

Shijiazhuang Zoo is located on the west side of the city. The zoo has 3,000 animals of 250 species including flamingos, golden monkeys, manchurian tigers, Indian elephants, giraffes, chimpanzees, kangaroos, seals, white tigers, springboks and pandas. Near the Shijiazhuang Zoo are the Botanical Gardens, offering a range of exotic and native plants both to view and purchase. The Martyrs Memorial can be found in the centre of the city, commemorating the soldiers lost in war.

Main sights

Baodu Zhai, or Baodu Village, is an ancient fortified hilltop settlement located on the west side of the city, the mountain contains walks and buddhist statues. Close to Baodu Zhai is Fenglong Mountain is situated  outside of Shijiazhuang to the west, the mountain features walks and a large stone Buddha statue situated on top of the mountain. Mount Cangyan is a scenic area in Jingxing County, famous for its combination of natural mountain scenery with historical man-made structures. It was featured in a scene of the Chinese movie Crouching Tiger, Hidden Dragon.

The Longxing Temple is an ancient Buddhist monastery located just outside the city. It has been referred to as the "First Temple south of Beijing". The Anji Bridge (also known as Zhaozhou Bridge) is the world's oldest open-spandrel stone segmental arch bridge. Credited to the design of a craftsman named Li Chun, the bridge was constructed in the years 595–605 during the Sui dynasty (581–618). It is the oldest standing bridge in China. The Pagoda of Bailin Temple ( or ) is an octagonal-based brick Chinese pagoda built in 1330 during the reign of Emperor Wenzong, ruler of the Mongol-led Yuan dynasty (1271–1368).

City parks
The downtown area of the city contains a range of parks. The largest park is found in the centre of the city known as Chang'an Park, the park includes an underground shopping mall, a theatre, a museum, a lake, bars and restaurants. Another park is found on the south east side of the city: Century Park, Century Park contains a lake in the centre with an amusement park to the north side. On the northwest side of the city is Water Park which features a large lake, amusement rides, short walks and various restaurants. As well as these three large parks there are smaller parks scattered across the city.

Shopping
The largest mall in the city is the Wanda shopping mall, located in the southeast side of the city, along with the Lerthai Shopping Complex at the downtown, and Wondermall on the southwest side. The Wanda mall includes an IMAX theatre.

Food
During the summer barbecue restaurants open, selling a whole range of foods, the most popular of which are lamb kebabs. Thousands of restaurants can be found across the city offering a range of Chinese as well as western cuisine open around the clock.

Cultural references
The 2018 arthouse film An Elephant Sitting Still by Hu Bo was shot and set in Shijiazhuang.

Notable people
Deng Lun, actor
Kang Hui, news anchor for China Central Television.
Omnipotent Youth Society, Chinese alternative rock band that was formed in the late 1990s.
Feng Zhang, Chinese-American biochemist. Known for his role in the development of CRISPR technologies.
Sun Yingsha, table tennis player.
Zhao Tuo, Qin dynasty Chinese general. Founder of Triệu dynasty.
Zhao Yun, military general who lived during the late Han dynasty and early Three Kingdoms period.
Li Jiang, an official of Tang dynasty, serving as a chancellor during the reign of Emperor Xianzong.
Li Deyu, a Chinese poet, politician, and writer of Tang dynasty. 
Han Shantong, one of leaders of the early Red Turban rebellion. 
Zhou Dongyu, actress considered one of the Four Dan actresses of the post 90's generation
Zheng Yuanjie, Chinese fairy tale author, and founder and sole writer of a children's literature magazine known as the King of Fairy Tales.

Sports
Shijiazhuang Ever Bright F.C. is a Chinese football club based in Shijiazhuang, Hebei, which competes in the Chinese Super League. It plays in the 37,000-seat Yutong International Sports Centre. The team changed to their current name on February 24, 2014.

Yutong International Sports Center is a multi-use stadium, used mostly for football matches. The capacity is 38,500.

Hospitals

 Hebei General Hospital
 The First Hospital of Shijiazhuang City
 The Third Hospital of Hebei Medical University
 Bethune International Peace Hospital , namesake after Norman Bethune a Canadian thoracic surgeon who is honored for his humanitarian service in bringing modern medicine to rural China.

Education

Universities and colleges 

 Shijiazhuang University
 Hebei GEO University
 Shijiazhuang Tiedao University
 Hebei Normal University
 Hebei Medical University

Twin towns and sister cities

Shijiazhuang's twin towns and sister cities are:

  Nagano, Nagano Prefecture, Japan (April 19, 1981)
  Saskatoon, Saskatchewan, Canada (May 31, 1985)
  Des Moines, Iowa, United States (August 8, 1986)
  Edison, New Jersey, United States (Date unknown)
  Parma, Emilia-Romagna, Italy (September 22, 1987)
  Corby, England, United Kingdom (October 5, 1994)
  Ayagawa, Kagawa Prefecture, Japan (May 23, 1995)
  Solofra, Avellino, Italy (August 17, 1997)
  Cheonan, South Chungcheong, South Korea (August 26, 1997)
  Querétaro City, Querétaro, Mexico (September 2, 1997)
  Richmond Hill, Ontario, Canada (July 9, 1998)
  Falkenberg, Halland County, Sweden (August 6, 2002)
  Nam Định, Nam Định Province, Vietnam (December 27, 2004)
  Nagykanizsa, Zala County, Hungary (2007)

See also 

 List of twin towns and sister cities in China
 Yanzhao Evening News

References

External links 

 Shijiazhuang Government official website

 
1925 establishments in China
Cities in Hebei
Provincial capitals in China
Prefecture-level divisions of Hebei